Piotr Wiaderek (born 5 February 1984 in Rymań) is a Polish sprinter. He competed in the 4 × 400 m relay event at the 2012 Summer Olympics. He was earlier a reserve relay member at the 2008 Summer Olympics but was ultimately not selected to run.

Competition record

Personal bests
Outdoor
100 metres - 10.42 (2010)
200 metres - 20.84 (2011)
400 metres - 45.46 (2012)

Indoor
60 metres - 6.80 (2006)
200 metres - 21.37 (2010)
400 metres - 48.06 (2009)

References

External links
 

Polish male sprinters
1984 births
Living people
Olympic athletes of Poland
Athletes (track and field) at the 2012 Summer Olympics
People from Kołobrzeg County
Sportspeople from West Pomeranian Voivodeship
Universiade medalists in athletics (track and field)
Universiade silver medalists for Poland
Medalists at the 2009 Summer Universiade
21st-century Polish people